Sammy Douglas is a Democratic Unionist Party (DUP) politician who was a   Member of the Northern Ireland Assembly (MLA) for Belfast East from 2011 to 2017. He decided not to stand for election again in 2017.

References

External links
Official website

1953 births
Living people
Democratic Unionist Party MLAs
Northern Ireland MLAs 2011–2016
Northern Ireland MLAs 2016–2017
Politicians from Belfast